Helix lutescens is species of air-breathing land snail, a terrestrial pulmonate gastropod mollusk in the family Helicidae, the true snails. 

This species of snail creates and uses calcareous love darts.

Distribution
Its native distribution is pericarpathian.

 Poland - Near Threatened (NT, mentioned as lower risk LR)
 Slovakia
 Ukraine

References

 Rossmässler, E. A. (1835-1837). Iconographie der Land- & Süßwasser- Mollusken, mit vorzüglicher Berücksichtigung der europäischen noch nicht abgebildeten Arten. (1) 1 (1): VI + 1-132. pl. 1-5 [≥ Apr. 1835]; (1) 1 (2): 6 + 1-26. pl. 6-10 [≥ Aug. 1835]; (1) 1 (3): 4 + 1-33. pl. 11-15 [≥ Mar. 1836]; (1) 1 (4): 4 + 1-27. pl. 16-20 [≥ Sept. 1836]; (1) 1 (5/6): 4 + 1–70. pl. 21–30 [≥ Jul. 1837]. [Dresden und Leipzig (Arnoldische Buchhandlung)] page(s): (1) 1 (5/6): 4, Taf. 21, Fig. 292 
 Bank, R. A.; Neubert, E. (2017). Checklist of the land and freshwater Gastropoda of Europe. Last update: July 16th, 2017.
 Sysoev, A. V. & Schileyko, A. A. (2009). Land snails and slugs of Russia and adjacent countries. Sofia/Moskva (Pensoft). 312 pp., 142 plates

Helix (gastropod)
Gastropods described in 1758
Taxa named by Carl Linnaeus